The Mexico national handball team is the national team of Mexico. It takes part in international handball competitions.

Tournament record

Pan American Championship

Central American and Caribbean Games

Caribbean Handball Cup

Nor.Ca Championship

References

External links
IHF profile

Handball
Men's national handball teams